BAMF, or Bamf, may refer to:
Bamf, the sound generated by the fictional Marvel Comics character Nightcrawler when teleporting
Bundesamt für Migration und Flüchtlinge (Federal Office for Migration and Refugees), an agency of the Federal Ministry of the Interior in Germany
The Blake, Alexa, Murphy Factor, a professional wrestling tag team

See also
Bamff, a family estate in Scotland
Banff (disambiguation)